Tobias Bjarneby was born in 1974 in Stockholm. He is one of Sweden's most noted video game magazine writers. He was the editor in chief of Super POWER magazine (renamed Super Play in 1996) from 1993 to December 2004 and has written for Aftonbladet. Earlier, he worked for Nintendomagasinet. Currently he is the editor in chief of Level. He has advocated for public acceptance of gaming as a fashionable lifestyle rather than a geek activity.

He also wrote and directed the indie video game 198X, which was released in June, 2019. 198X features a collection of retro arcade-style minigames inside a nostalgic coming of age narrative.

References 

1974 births
Living people
Swedish journalists
Video game critics